Crane Creek is a stream in Sonoma County, California, United States which rises in the northern Sonoma Mountains.  This watercourse flows through Crane Canyon and the Crane Creek Regional Park situated on the northwestern flank of Sonoma Mountain.  Crane Creek forms a confluence with Hinebaugh Creek in the city of Rohnert Park; thereafter, the channelized  Hinebaugh Creek flows westerly to discharge to the Laguna de Santa Rosa.  Hiking access to the upper Crane Creek reaches is from Roberts Road off Petaluma Hill Road.

See also
Fairfield Osborn Preserve
Five Creek
List of watercourses in the San Francisco Bay Area

References

Rivers of Sonoma County, California
Sonoma Mountains
Tributaries of the Russian River (California)
Rivers of Northern California